Planodiscus is a genus of tortoise mites in the family Uropodidae. There are at least two described species in Planodiscus.

Species
These two species belong to the genus Planodiscus:
 Planodiscus hamatus
 Planodiscus squamatim Sellnick, 1926

References

Uropodidae
Articles created by Qbugbot